1993 Russian referendum may refer to:
1993 Russian government referendum
1993 Russian constitutional referendum